Starz Distribution (formerly IDT Entertainment and Starz Media) is the motion picture, animation, television, and home video operating unit of Starz Inc., a subsidiary of Lionsgate. Starz Distribution develops, produces, and acquires original programming content (through Starz Originals), feature films, and other filmed entertainment. Distribution methods include DVD, digital formats and traditional television.

History
In 2003, IDT Corporation, a telecommunications company based in New Jersey, formed a film, home entertainment and television division known as IDT Entertainment following its acquisition of the animation studio Film Roman. Later on in the year, it acquired Anchor Bay Entertainment, owned DPS, and stakes in Mainframe Entertainment and Vanguard Animation, and also acquired DKP Studios and turned it into their own animation studio.

In May 2004, IDT Entertainment purchased a minority share in POW! Entertainment with exclusive distribution rights to POW's animated DVD properties and joint development of 6 cartoon films. In 2005, IDT signed a deal with 20th Century Fox. On May 16, 2006, IDT agreed to sell its IDT Entertainment division to Liberty Media "for all of Liberty Media's interests in IDT, $186 million in cash and the assumption of existing indebtedness." On August 31, 2006, the sale of all of IDT Entertainment's US operations and several international operations was completed. "The remainder of the deal, to include the Canadian and Australian operations, is expected to be closed in the next few weeks after regulatory approval has been given." This sale was completed on September 29, 2006. Liberty then merged IDT Entertainment and its divisions with the Starz cable network to form Starz Media.

On January 4, 2011, The Weinstein Company purchased a 25% stake in the operating unit. While not including TV rights, the deal spans Blu-ray, DVD and VOD, pay-per-view and digital distribution and covers up to 20 TWC and Dimension titles per year. They include The King's Speech, Blue Valentine and Company Men. Starz acquired the 25% stake owned by Weinstein in October 2015.

On January 11, 2013, Liberty Media Corporation completed the "spin-off" of its Starz Entertainment segment as a separate entity. Under this new structure, the entity that was known as "Starz Media" became Starz Distribution.

In November 2015, Waterman Entertainment purchased Film Roman from Starz Distribution.

On December 8, 2016, Lionsgate purchased Starz Inc. for $4.4 billion.

Former assets
 Mainframe Entertainment (now owned by Wow Unlimited Media)
 Film Roman (now owned by Waterman Entertainment)
 Digital Production Solutions (DPS)
 Global Animation Studio - a division of DPS
 Arc Productions (now owned by Boat Rocker Media as Jam Filled Entertainment’s Toronto office).
 POW! Entertainment (5%, now owned by Camsing International Holding)
 Anchor Bay Entertainment (shut down, folded into Lionsgate Home Entertainment)
 Manga Entertainment - distribution of anime (transferred to Lionsgate Home Entertainment)

Starz Distribution previously held minority stakes in:
 Vanguard Animation (minority interest);
 Joint venture with NorthStar Entertainment Group, Inc., a subsidiary of the Christian Broadcasting Network.

Live-action films
 Jericho (2001)
 It Waits (2006)
 Room 6 (2006)
 Queen Sized (2008)
 Lower Learning (2008)
 Blue Seduction (2009)
 Table for Three (2009)
 The Dog Who Saved Christmas (2009)
 A Nanny for Christmas (2010)
 The Dog Who Saved Christmas Vacation (2010)
 The Dog Who Saved Halloween (2011)
 Flock of Dudes (2017)

Animated films
Starz Distribution/IDT Entertainment have been in charge of the animation production or distribution of the following films:

Theatrical
 Hair High (2004; with Plymptoons) (distribution only)
 Everyone's Hero (2006; with 20th Century Fox)
 The Pirates Who Don't Do Anything: A VeggieTales Movie (2008; with Big Idea Productions & Universal Pictures)
 Space Chimps (2008; with Vanguard Animation & 20th Century Fox) (distribution only)
 9 (2009; with Focus Features)

TV specials
 The Happy Elf (2005; with Film Roman and NBC)
 Wubbzy's Big Movie! (2008; with Bolder Media and Film Roman)
 Wow! Wow! Wubbzy!: Wubb Idol (2009; with Bolder Media and Film Roman)

Direct-to-Video
 Hellboy: Sword of Storms (2006; with Revolution Studios)
 Stan Lee Presents: Mosaic (2007; with POW Entertainment & Anchor Bay)
 Turok: Son of Stone (2008; with Classic Media, Film Roman, and Genius Products)
 The Haunted World of El Superbeasto (2009; with Film Roman, Carbunckle Cartoons, and Anchor Bay Films)
 Dante's Inferno: An Animated Epic (2010; with Production I.G)
 The Legend of Secret Pass (2010; with JC2 Animated Entertainment)
 Dead Space: Aftermath (2011; with Pumpkin Studio, Visceral Games, & Electronic Arts)

References

External links
 
 
 

Film distributors of the United States
Mass media companies of the United States
Entertainment companies based in California
Companies based in Burbank, California
Entertainment companies established in 2006
2006 establishments in California